The Tully Falls, a horsetail chute waterfall on the Tully River, is located in the UNESCO World Heritagelisted Wet Tropics in the Far North region of Queensland, Australia. It formed the eastern boundary of the Dyirbal.

Location and features
Access to the falls is via a  graded track.

Most of the water that would have otherwise flowed over the falls has been diverted to the Kareeya Hydro Power Station and dammed by Koombooloomba Dam. As a result, the falls flow only during a big wet season.

See also

 List of waterfalls of Queensland

References

Waterfalls of Far North Queensland